Lake Frome National Park, formerly  Lake Frome Regional Reserve, is a protected area located in the Australian state of South Australia about  north-east of the state capital of Adelaide, in the Northern Flinders Ranges. It covers the full extent of Lake Frome, an endorheic and ephemeral salt lake.

History
Lake Frome Regional Reserve was proclaimed as a Regional Reserve on 19 December 1991 for the following purposes and uses:…to extend the conservation management of the adjoining Vulkathunha-Gammon Ranges National Park. It conserves a large arid salt lake system that is of regional geological significance. The dominant land use of the reserve is biological and cultural conservation.

On 26  November 2021, the reserve's status was upgraded to a national park in recognition of its significance as a large salt lake, giving it the same status as other large salt lakes such as Kati Thanda-Lake Eyre, Lake Torrens and Lake Gairdner.

Location and description

As an ephemeral a salt lake system, it is representative of very rare and little-known environments, and therefore considered to be of national significance.

Since 2013, it has been located within the boundaries of the gazetted locality of Lake Frome

Classification

The regional reserve was classified as an IUCN Category VI protected area.

See also
 Protected areas of South Australia

References

External links
Entry for Lake Frome Regional Reserve on protected planet

Regional reserves of South Australia
Protected areas established in 1991
1991 establishments in Australia
Far North (South Australia)